The Saigon Waterbus (Vietnamese: Buýt đường sông Thành phố Hồ Chí Minh) is a transportation service in Ho Chi Minh City, Vietnam operating on the Saigon River. Launched in November 2017, the Waterbus offers services between District 1 and Thu Duc City. In 2021, the Waterbus launched an evening service from 5:00-9:00 PM.

Piers

References 
Transport in Ho Chi Minh City
Public transport in Ho Chi Minh City